These are all the matches played by the Spain national football team between 1990 and 1999:

Meaning

Results
98 matches played:

1990

1991

1992

1993

1994

1995

1996

1997

1998

1999

References

External links
Todos los partidos (all the games) at Selección Española de Fútbol (official site) 

1990s in Spanish sport
1990
1989–90 in Spanish football
1990–91 in Spanish football
1991–92 in Spanish football
1992–93 in Spanish football
1993–94 in Spanish football
1994–95 in Spanish football
1995–96 in Spanish football
1996–97 in Spanish football
1997–98 in Spanish football
1998–99 in Spanish football
1999–2000 in Spanish football